Prabhat Kids School is a CBSE-affiliated pre-primary, primary, and secondary school in Akola, Maharashtra. The school was established in 2003 by Dr. Gajanan Nare and his wife Vandana Nare. The school has classes from 1st to 12th standards with many facilities such as canteen, chemistry lab,  physics lab, biology lab from students can learn science with practicals with fun. And the school environment is also pollution-free as it is far away from Akola city and situated at washim bypass where there is solidarity except trees and green scenery. The school is having many sport like cricket, football, taekwondo, rifle shooting etc. and has a big 10 acres land for it  The school is the only day boarding school in Akola.

References

External links

Schools in Maharashtra
Education in Akola
Educational institutions established in 2003
2003 establishments in Maharashtra